Lively Teresa (Italian: La vispa Teresa) is a 1943 Italian "white-telephones" comedy film directed by Mario Mattoli and starring Lilia Silvi, Roberto Villa and Carlo Ninchi. It was produced in the style of the White Telephone comedies popular during the Fascist era.

The film was only fully released following the Liberation of Rome, alongside other equally innocuous films such as The Innocent Casimiro. This provoked criticism from supporters of the emerging neorealist movement who wanted to promote what they regarded as more innovative films, while the major film companies such as Lux Film and Minverva preferred more populist offerings.

It was shot at the Palatino Studios in Rome. The film's sets were designed by the art directors Piero Filippone and Mario Rappini.

Plot
A wealthy engineer is disturbed when he discovers that his son Alberto has fallen in love with an ambitious manicurist Luisa. He arranges for him to go on holiday to Venice while he tries to buy off Luisa. However, Luisa has secretly accompanied Alberto, and has got her friend Teresa to take her place at the beauty parlour. Alberto's parents mistake her for Luisa, and complications ensue.

Cast
 Lilia Silvi as Teresa
 Antonio Gandusio as Antonio, suo zio
 Vera Carmi as Luisa, la manicure
 Roberto Villa as Alberto Mari
 Carlo Ninchi as Carlo Mari, suo padre
 Giuditta Rissone as Matilde Mari, madre di Alberto
 Tino Scotti as Albertaccio
 Aldo Silvani as Il colonello Rossi
 Cesare Fantoni as Il maggiordomo di casa Mari
 Achille Majeroni as Un collabotatore del signor Mari 
 Edda Soligo as La segretaria del Signor Mari 
 Carlo Lombardi as Il commendatore 
 Carlo Campanini as Un cliente dal barbiere
 Peppino Spadaro as L'usciere siciliano 
 Leopoldo Valentini as Un cliente al bar

References

Bibliography
 Gundle, Stephen. Mussolini's Dream Factory: Film Stardom in Fascist Italy. Berghahn Books, 2013.

External links

1943 films
1943 comedy films
Italian comedy films
1940s Italian-language films
Italian black-and-white films
Films directed by Mario Mattoli
Minerva Film films
Films shot at Palatino Studios
1940s Italian films